Trichoneuron is a genus of ferns in the family Dryopteridaceae, subfamily Polybotryoideae, in the Pteridophyte Phylogeny Group classification of 2016 (PPG I). The genus has a single species Trichoneuron microlepioides, native to Yunnan, China.

References

Dryopteridaceae
Monotypic fern genera